Joseph Purzycki (born February 20, 1947) is a former American football coach. He served as the head football coach at Delaware State University in Dover, Delaware from 1981 to 1984 and James Madison University in Harrisonburg, Virginia from 1985 to 1990, compiling a career college football coaching record of 55–51–3. Purzycki played college football at the University of Delaware and was later an assistant coach at his alma mater, where he learned the Wing T offense from head coach Tubby Raymond. When Purzycki was hired as the head football coach at Delaware State in January 1981, he became the first white man appointed to that role for the historically black school. Many students and players had expected Delaware State to hire Billy Joe, an African American who had played professionally in the American Football League (AFL) and was then an assistant coach for the Philadelphia Eagles of the National Football League (NFL). Some students and players protested Purzycki's hiring.

Head coaching record

College

References

1947 births
Living people
Delaware Fightin' Blue Hens football coaches
Delaware Fightin' Blue Hens football players
Delaware State Hornets football coaches
James Madison Dukes football coaches
High school football coaches in Delaware
High school football coaches in New Jersey
Players of American football from Newark, New Jersey